The House Built Upon Sand is a 1916 American drama film directed by  Edward Morrissey and starring Lillian Gish. This is a lost film.

Cast
 Lillian Gish as Evelyn Dare
 Roy Stewart as David Westebrooke
 William H. Brown as Samuel Stevens
 Bessie Buskirk as Josie
 Jack Brammall as Ted
 Josephine Crowell as Mrs. Shockley
 Kate Bruce as David's Housekeeper

See also
 Lillian Gish filmography

References

External links

1916 films
1916 lost films
1916 comedy-drama films
American silent feature films
American black-and-white films
1910s English-language films
Lost American films
Triangle Film Corporation films
Lost comedy-drama films
1910s American films
Silent American comedy-drama films